This is a alphabetical list of openly lesbian, gay, bisexual, and transgender politicians who have held office in the United States. Historical figures are included only if there is documented evidence of an open queer identity.

Most openly LGBT politicians in the U.S. are part of the Democratic Party, which has taken a more favorable stance than Republicans towards LGBT rights.

Federal

Executive

Legislative

State

Executive

Legislative
This is a dynamic list and may never be able to satisfy particular standards for completeness. You can help by expanding it with reliably sourced entries.

Local

Executive

Legislative

See also 
LGBT conservatism in the United States

Notes

References 

United States
LGBT
 
Lists of American LGBT people